Events in the year 1636 in Norway.

Incumbents
Monarch: Christian IV

Births

Full date unknown
Jens Toller Rosenheim, nobleman and jurist (died 1690).

See also

References